Luuk Kroon (born 13 December 1942, Ridderkerk – d. 19 June 2012, The Hague) was a Dutch naval officer. Kroon served as the Commander of the Royal Netherlands Navy from 1995 to 1998 and Chief of the Netherlands Defence Staff from 1998 until 2004. He died in The Hague on 19 June 2012, at the age of 69.

Awards and decorations
 Commander of the Order of Orange-Nassau with Swords
 Officer's Long Service Cross
 Marriage Medal 2002 (celebrates the wedding of Willem-Alexander of the Netherlands and Máxima Zorreguieta)
 Navy Medal
 Grand Officer of the Order of the Crown of Belgium
 Commander of the Legion of Merit (United States)
 Commander of the Legion of Honour (France)
 Officer of the National Order of Merit (France) (Ordre National du Mérite)
 Cross of Honour of the Bundeswehr in Gold (Germany)

References

External links 
 

1942 births
2012 deaths
People from Ridderkerk
Chiefs of the Defence Staff (Netherlands)
Commanders of the Royal Netherlands Navy
Royal Netherlands Navy admirals
Royal Netherlands Navy officers
Grand Officers of the Order of the Crown (Belgium)
Commanders of the Legion of Merit
Commandeurs of the Légion d'honneur
Officers of the Ordre national du Mérite
Recipients of the Badge of Honour of the Bundeswehr